The Big Chase is a 1954 American crime drama film directed by Arthur Hilton and starring Glenn Langan, Adele Jergens, Lon Chaney Jr., Jim Davis and Douglas Kennedy. One of the film's scenes was directed by producer Robert L. Lippert Jr. This is the second film in which Langan appeared with Jergens, his real-life wife.

Premise
A policeman with a pregnant wife on his side uses a helicopter to chase a payroll thief trying to escape to Mexico.

Cast
Glenn Langan as Officer Pete Grayson
Adele Jergens as Doris Grayson
Lon Chaney Jr. as Kip
Jim Davis as Brad Bellows
Douglas Kennedy as Police Lt. Ned Daggert
Jay Lawrence as Jim Miggs
Joe Flynn as Milton Graves
Phil Arnold as Bunkie
Gil Perkins as Payroll Guard
Wheaton Chambers as Doctor Janssen
Lita Milan as Nurse

References

External links

1954 films
American drama films
American black-and-white films
1954 drama films
Lippert Pictures films
Films directed by Arthur Hilton
1950s English-language films
1950s American films